Kavečany is a borough (city ward) of Košice, Slovakia. Kavečany retains a rural character, with a population of more than 1150 inhabitants. It's known mostly as a place for recreation and relaxation. Kavečany is famous for its ski center, summer toboggan track, and the Košice Zoo.

History 

Until 1976, Kavečany was a separate municipality, classified as a village. In 1976, it was merged with the city of Košice and became one of its outer boroughs, as part of the urban Košice I district.

The village of Kavečany first appeared in written records in 1347.

Tourism 

Kavečany is a popular place mostly for recreational activities. The ski resort offers a variety of services including snowmaking. There are excellent conditions for both cross-country and downhill skiing here. Other local attractions include the summer toboggan track and the third-largest zoological garden in Europe. The surrounding countryside offers many hiking and biking trails which extend to the great and attractive area of Čierna Hora.

Cultural festivals 

The most interesting cultural and social events during the year are associated with the local folklore ensemble "Kavečianka", who preserves the traditions of their ancestors through songs and dance routines.

Sports events 

The annual half marathon run and the new motocross race are the most significant sports events in the village.

Basic data

 Latitude: 48.7833, Longitude: 21.2167
 Latitude (DMS): 48° 46' 60N, Longitude (DMS): 21° 13' 0E
 Altitude: 1,217 feet (350 m)

Statistics

 Area: 
 Population: 1,310 (December 2017) 
 Density of population: 130/km2 (December 2017)
 District: Košice I
 Mayor: JUDr. Martin Balčík (as of 2018 elections)

Gallery

References

External links

 Official website of the Kavečany borough
 Article on the Kavečany borough at Cassovia.sk
 Ski center information (in Slovak and Hungarian languages)
 Official website of Košice

Boroughs of Košice
Villages in Slovakia merged with towns
Šariš